Mieko Fukuno is a former international table tennis player from Japan.

Table tennis career
She won a bronze medal at the 1971 World Table Tennis Championships in the mixed doubles with Tokuyasu Nishii.

She also won three Asian Championship medals.

See also
 List of table tennis players
 List of World Table Tennis Championships medalists

References

Living people
Japanese female table tennis players
World Table Tennis Championships medalists
Year of birth missing (living people)